Hindu–Muslim unity is a religiopolitical concept in the Indian subcontinent which stresses members of the two largest faith groups there, Hindus and Muslims, working together for 
the common good. The concept was championed by various persons, such as leaders in the Indian independence movement, namely Mahatma Gandhi and Khan Abdul Ghaffar Khan, as well as by political parties and movements, such as the Indian National Congress, Khudai Khidmatgar and All India Azad Muslim Conference. Those who opposed the partition of colonial India often adhered to the doctrine of composite nationalism.

History 

In Mughal India, the emperor Akbar advocated for Hindu–Muslim unity, appointing both Hindus and Muslims as officials in his court. Akbar participated and promoted festivals of both Hinduism and Islam. He also created feasts, such as Phool Walon Ki Sair (although this festival is said to have been started much later in the nineteenth century under Akbar II) to be celebrated by citizens of all faiths.

Chhatrapati Shivaji also promoted Hindu–Muslim unity. Maratha Hindavi Swarajya had many Muslims in high posts. Shivaji's personal security, his most trusted courtiers, were Muslims. A Muslim general had led the Maratha troops in the third battle of Panipat and sacrificed for the cause.

Sayyid Jamal al-Din al-Afghani Asadabadi advocated for Hindu–Muslim unity, maintaining that it would help the Indian independence movement in their goal to establish an independent India.

In the Indian Rebellion of 1857, many Hindus and Muslims of India mobilized together to fight against the East India Company. Reflecting on this in 2007, Manmohan Singh stated that these events "stood as a great testimony to the traditions of Hindu–Muslim unity that held out as an example for subsequent generations".

The Lucknow Pact of 1916 was seen as an "important step forward in achieving Hindu–Muslim unity" during the era of the Indian independence movement. Muhammad Ali Jinnah advocated Hindu–Muslim unity in early years of his political career. Gopal Krishna Gokhale stated that Jinnah "has true stuff in him, and that freedom from all sectarian prejudice which will make him the best ambassador of Hindu–Muslim Unity".

Muslim scholars of the Deoband school of thought, such as Qari Muhammad Tayyib and Kifayatullah Dihlawi, championed Hindu–Muslim unity, composite nationalism, and called for a united India. Maulana Sayyid Hussain Ahmad Madani, the leader of the Jamiat Ulema-e-Hind, stated:

Malik Khizar Hayat Tiwana, the Premier of Punjab in colonial India, advocated for amity between the religious communities of undivided India, proclaiming March 1 as Communal Harmony Day and aiding in the establishment of a Communal Harmony Committee in Lahore, in which Raja Narendra Nath served as president and Maulvi Mahomed Ilyas as secretary.

In 1940, Maghfoor Ahmad Ajazi established the All-India Jamhur Muslim League to support a united India and to counter the Lahore resolution, passed by the All-India Muslim League, for a separate Pakistan based on Muhammad Ali Jinnah's Two nation theory. He served as the first General Secretary of the All India Jamhur Muslim League.

Threats to Hindu–Muslim unity 
In the Indian Rebellion of 1857, many Hindus and Muslims in India joined together as Indians to fight against the British East India Company. The British government became concerned about this rise in Indian nationalism therefore; according to some writers, they tried to stir up communalistic feelings among Hindus and Muslims so that they might not again unite to try and overthrow crown rule. For example, Theodore Beck, the principal of Muhammadan Anglo-Oriental College, had told Syed Ahmad Khan that Muslims should have no sympathy with the objectives of the Indian National Congress and "that Anglo-Muslims unity was possible, but Hindu–Muslims unity was impossible".

The author of Composite Nationalism and Islam, Maulana Husain Ahmad Madani, a Deobandi Muslim scholar and proponent of a united India, argued that the British government were attempting to "scare Muslims into imagining that in a free India, Muslims would lose their separate identity, and be absorbed into the Hindu fold", a threat that "aim[ed] at depoliticizing the Muslims, weaning them away from struggle
for independence." In the eyes of Madani, support for a two-nation theory resulted in the entrenchment of British imperialism.

In the same vein, Kashmiri Indian politician and Supreme Court judge Markandey Katju wrote in The Nation:

On the other hand, Ajay Verghese says that the conflicts between the Hindu-Muslim population existed long before arrival of the British to the Indian subcontinent; he says that in places where British had less influence (like the princely states), the number of communal riots was more frequent as compared to places which were directly under British rule (like British Indian provinces).

See also 
Madani–Iqbal debate
Composite nationalism
Gandhism
Ganga-Jamuni tehzeeb
Hindu–Islamic relations
Opposition to the partition of India
Phool Walon Ki Sair
Swaraj

References 

Indian independence movement
Gandhism
Hinduism and Islam
Islam in India
Hinduism in India
Secularism in India
Power sharing